Lucie Hradecká and Renata Voráčová were the defending champions, but both players chose not to participate.

Alizé Cornet and Virginie Razzano won the title defeating Maria Kondratieva and Sophie Lefèvre in the final 6–3, 6–2.

Seeds

Draw

Draw

References
 Main Draw

Internationaux Feminins de la Vienne - Doubles